Sturgis may refer to:

Places

Canada
Sturgis, Saskatchewan, a town in the east central region

United States
Sturgis, Kentucky, a city in Union County
Sturgis, Michigan, a city in St. Joseph County
Sturgis Township, Michigan, a township in St. Joseph County
Sturgis, Mississippi, a town in Oktibbeha County
Sturgis, Oklahoma, an unincorporated place in Cimarron County
Sturgis, South Dakota, a city in Meade County

Other uses
Sturgis Charter Public School, a high school in Hyannis, Massachusetts
The Sturgis, MH-1A, the first floating nuclear power plant 
Sturgis Motorcycle Rally, an annual event in Sturgis, South Dakota
Sturgis station, a railway station in Sturgis, Saskatchewan
Sturgis Rifles, an Illinois Civil War unit
Sturgis (surname)

See also
Sturges, surnames and other uses
Turgis (disambiguation)